Michael Wessel could refer to:

Mike Wessel (born 1977), American mixed martial artist
Michael Wessel (German footballer)